Dearborn Street is a street in Chicago, where it is 36 W in its grid system. It is the street immediately to the west of State Street, the city's north–south baseline.

Dearborn Street appears on James Thompson's 1830 plat of Chicago, and was named for being the closest named north–south street to Fort Dearborn.

The Dearborn Street Bridge carries the street across the Chicago River. Dearborn station formerly served inter-city trains. The Milwaukee-Dearborn subway underlies the street downtown.

Notes

References

Streets in Chicago